Alessandro Verona (born 11 August 1995) is an Italian professional roller hockey player who plays for Sporting CP.

References

1995 births
Living people
Italian roller hockey players
Sporting CP roller hockey players
Sportspeople from Lucca